K7, K07 or K-7 may refer to:

 A complete graph with 7 Vertices
 Bluebird K7, a high speed hydroplane raced by Donald Campbell
 Daewoo Precision Industries K7, a submachine gun with an integrated suppressor
 Deep Space Station K7, a fictional space station featured in the Star Trek episodes "The Trouble With Tribbles" and "Trials and Tribble-ations"
 K7 (mountain), a mountain of the Karakoram range, in Pakistan
 K-7 (Kansas highway), a state highway in Kansas
 Kalinin K-7, a heavy experimental aircraft designed and tested in the Soviet Union in the early 1930s
 Kronprinsens husarregemente, a Swedish Army cavalry regiment disbanded 1927
 Pentax K-7, a DSLR camera by Hoya Corporation
 Schleicher K7, a 2-seater glider plane made from wood and steel

Computing 
 AMD K7, codename for certain AMD CPUs, including the Athlon, Athlon XP, Duron and some Sempron microprocessors

Music 
 Ibanez K7, a series of guitars
 K7 (musician) (born 1967), American rapper
 Studio !K7, German record label
 Violin Sonata No. 2 (Mozart), by Wolfgang Amadeus Mozart

Submarines
 , a British submarine of the First World War
 , a 1914 United States Navy K-class submarine

Ship disambiguation pages